is a museum dedicated to instant noodles and Cup Noodles, as well as its creator and founder, Momofuku Ando.

Located at Yokohama, the museum feature four stories of exhibitions and attractions. This location includes various exhibits to display the history of instant ramen and Momofuku Ando's story.

References

External links

Museums in Yokohama
Food museums in Japan
Ramen
Museums established in 2011
2011 establishments in Japan